The 2003–04 Indiana Hoosiers men's basketball team represented Indiana University in the 2003–04 college basketball season. Their head coach was Mike Davis, who was in his fourth season. The team played its home games at Assembly Hall in Bloomington, Indiana, and was a member of the Big Ten Conference.

Indiana finished the season with an overall record of 14–15 and a conference record of 7–9, finishing 8th place in the Big Ten Conference. Due to finishing under .500, the Hoosiers were not invited to play in any post-season tournament.  This season marked the first time since 1970 Indiana would finish with a losing record and the first time since 1985 they failed to make the NCAA tournament.

2003–04 Roster

Schedule and results

|-
!colspan=9 style=| Non-conference Regular Season
|-

|-
!colspan=9 style=| Big Ten Regular Season

|-
!colspan=9 style=| Big Ten tournament

References

Indiana Hoosiers
Indiana Hoosiers men's basketball seasons
2003 in sports in Indiana
2004 in sports in Indiana